Aleksandrs Kerčs (sometimes anglicised as Alexander Kerch, Aleksandr Jaroslavovich Kerch; born March 16, 1967) is a retired Soviet and Latvian professional ice hockey left winger who played five games in the National Hockey League (NHL) for the Edmonton Oilers. He also appeared in several World Championships and the 2002 Winter Olympics for the Latvian national team. Previously, he represented the Soviet Union at the 1987 World Junior Ice Hockey Championships.

Career 
Kerčs enjoyed a lengthy career in European professional leagues, interrupted by a brief stint in North America for the 1993–94 season.

The Edmonton Oilers acquired the third-round draft pick of the New York Rangers (60th overall) along with Roman Oksiuta in a trade that saw Kevin Lowe join the Rangers.  The Oilers used the pick on Kerčs, a 26-year-old of the Russian Elite League.  Kerčs came to North America for the following season, where he spent the majority of the year with the Cape Breton Oilers of the AHL.  He scored at a better than point-per-game clip in the minors and went pointless in five games with the Oilers.  The following year, Kerčs played one game with the Providence Bruins, before returning to Russia.

International
Kerčs played internationally for Latvia between the years 1993-2005, and was part of the team that won the World Championships B-pool in 1996.

Career statistics

Regular season and playoffs

LAT totals do not include stats from the 2005–06 season.

International

References

External links
 
 
 
 

1967 births
Living people
Soviet emigrants to Latvia
Cape Breton Oilers players
Dinamo Riga players
Edmonton Oilers draft picks
Edmonton Oilers players
Ice hockey players at the 2002 Winter Olympics
Molot-Prikamye Perm players
Latvian ice hockey left wingers
Olympic ice hockey players of Latvia
Sportspeople from Arkhangelsk
Providence Bruins players
Soviet ice hockey players
Latvian expatriate sportspeople in Canada
Latvian expatriate sportspeople in the United States